The 1922 Wyoming gubernatorial election took place on November 5, 1918. Following the election of Governor John B. Kendrick to the U.S. Senate in 1916, Secretary of State Frank L. Houx served as acting Governor. He ran for re-election and faced a stiff challenge in the Democratic primary from attorney William B. Ross. After defeating Ross by a decisive margin, he faced Robert D. Carey, the Republican nominee and the son of former Democratic Governor Joseph M. Carey. However, despite Houx's past electoral success, he faced difficult headwinds as Democratic candidates did poorly across the country in 1918. He ended up losing re-election to Carey by a wide margin.

Democratic Primary

Candidates
 Frank L. Houx, incumbent Governor
 William B. Ross, attorney, 1910 Democratic nominee for Congress, former Laramie County Attorney

Results

Republican Primary

Candidates
 Robert D. Carey, Chairman of the State Highway Commission, former Converse County Commissioner
 M. B. Camplin, Mayor of Sheridan
 Leonidas R. A. Condit, former State Representative from Johnson County

Results

Results

References

1918 Wyoming elections
1918
Wyoming